Lee Siew Choh (1 November 1917 – 18 July 2002) was a Singaporean politician and physician. He was the Member of Parliament for Queenstown from 1959 to 1963 and served as the NCMP from September 1988 to August 1991.

Initially a member of the People's Action Party (PAP), he became a leader of the breakaway faction of Barisan Sosialis (BS) in 1961. After the BS merged with the Workers' Party (WP) in 1988, Lee stood as a WP candidate in the 1988 election and became Singapore's first Non-constituency Member of Parliament (NCMP) due to his best performance among the opposition candidates. He served as the NCMP from September 1988 to August 1991.

Biography
Lee was born in Kuala Lumpur and was educated at Victoria Institution. He came to Singapore in 1934 and was trained as a medical doctor at King Edward VII College of Medicine. After graduating in 1942, he joined Kandang Kerbau Hospital as a doctor. He married a volunteer nurse Kathleen Fam Yin Oi (1919 –⁠ 20 April 2018) in 1943 during the Japanese occupation of Singapore, he was later sent to work as a medical officer at the Thai-Burmese border for two years, where the Death Railway was constructed.

Political career 
Lee served in Singapore's Legislative Assembly as a representative of the PAP following the 1959 election. In 1960 he served as the Parliamentary Secretary for Home Affairs. In 1961, Lee and 13 other members of the assembly broke away from the PAP and formed the Socialist Front. Lee was noted for his pro-leftist stance and oratory skills. In 1961, he made the longest speech in the history of Singapore's Legislative Assembly which lasted seven hours on the subject of Singapore's proposed merger with Malaya. Lee led the party in the 1963 elections, in which they won 13 of the 51 seats.

In 1988, Socialist Front merged with the Workers' Party and Lee stood as a Workers' Party candidate in the Eunos Group Representation Constituency at the 1988 Singaporean general election, along with Francis Seow and Mohd Khalit bin Mohd Baboo. They lost to the PAP's team in the constituency by 49.1% of the votes to 50.9%. As the Workers' Party's team in Eunos had garnered a higher percentage of the vote than any other opposition losing candidates, the party was eligible to nominate two members of its team from Eunos to become Non-constituency MPs. The party had refused to nominate NCMPs in the past, but this time they nominated Lee and Seow to become NCMPs. Seow was subsequently accused of espionage and fled to the United States before he could take up his NCMP seat. Lee became Singapore's first-ever NCMP, serving until the 1991 general election. In Parliament, he raised several issues, including the Internal Security Act, living costs and welfare.

Lee again stood in Eunos GRC at the 1991 Singaporean general election. He and fellow party members Jufrie Mahmood, Neo Choon Aik and Wee Han Kim again lost narrowly to the PAP's team by 47.6% of the votes to 52.4%. However no NCMP seats were offered following that election as the opposition parties won a combined total of four elected seats.

Lee left the Workers' Party in 1996, citing differences with the party's leader, Joshua Benjamin Jeyaretnam.

Personal life 
Lee married Kathleen Fam and had three sons, Victor Lee Yew Kwong, Peter Lee Yew Chung and David Lee Yew Keong, and a daughter, Lee Yu Lian.

His eldest son, Victor Lee Yew Kwong, died in 1992.

Lee died of lung cancer on 18 July 2002.

See also
Lim Chin Siong
Chia Thye Poh

References

Members of the Parliament of Singapore
Singaporean Non-constituency Members of Parliament
Workers' Party (Singapore) politicians
Barisan Sosialis politicians
People's Action Party politicians
Singaporean people of Cantonese descent
Malaysian emigrants to Singapore
People who lost Malaysian citizenship
Naturalised citizens of Singapore
1917 births
2002 deaths
20th-century Singaporean physicians